Ditophal is an antileprotic drug which is no longer marketed.

The compound is diethyl dithiolisophthalate, the ethyl ester of a thiocarboxylic acid.

References
  

Antileprotic drugs
Thioesters